Kadhavaseshan is a 2004 Malayalam mystery drama film written and directed by T. V. Chandran, starring Dileep and Jyothirmayi in the lead roles. Veteran Bengali actress Gita Dey made a special appearance. It was the first movie in the 2002 Gujarat Riots trilogy by the director, the second one being Vilapangalkkappuram and the third and final one being Bhoomiyude Avakashikal. The narratives of all these films begin on the same day, 28 February 2002, that is, on the day after the Godhra train burning in Gujarat. The film was released on November 11 on the Eve of Diwali.

Plot
Gopinathan Menon, an engineer, is found dead in his flat. Renuka, his fiancee, wants to know the cause of his death. Hence, she decides to investigate the case, unravelling his last days through the perspective of people he interacted with. Finally she understands that Gopi committed suicide out of the shame of being alive in such a merciless society.

Cast
Dileep as Gopinathan Menon  Gopi
Jyothirmayi as Renuka
Pandiarajan as Kathavarayan
Vijayaraghavan as Janardhanan
Cochin Haneefa as S.I. Shaji
Janardanan as Veerabhadran Nair/Kuttammavan
Salim Kumar as Renuka's brother-in-law
Indrans as Thief Thorappan Vasu
Bindu Panikkar as Lathika, Gopi's sister
Gita Dey as old Bengali lady
Ambika Mohan as Renuka's mother
Nithya Das as Sreedevi
Stephy Leon as Nazeem
Shivaji
Lekshmi Krishnamoorthy as Gopi's mother
Irshad as Bhadran, Gopi's colleague
Nisha Sarang as Police Inspector's wife
Babu Annur
Manikandan Pattambi
Vijayan Peringode
Ashok Vishwanathan
Kalabhavan Prajod

Accolades

Music

The film's soundtrack album and score was composed by music director M Jayachandran. The Malayalam lyrics on the album were penned by writers Gireesh Puthanchery and the Gujarati lyrics by Gauhar Raza.

References

External links 
 

2004 films
2000s Malayalam-language films
Films scored by M. Jayachandran
Films directed by T. V. Chandran
2004 drama films
Indian nonlinear narrative films